Human coronavirus OC43 (HCoV-OC43) is a member of the species Betacoronavirus 1, which infects humans and cattle. The infecting coronavirus is an enveloped, positive-sense, single-stranded RNA virus that enters its host cell by binding to the N-acetyl-9-O-acetylneuraminic acid receptor. OC43 is one of seven coronaviruses known to infect humans. It is one of the viruses responsible for the common cold and may have been responsible for the 1889–1890 pandemic. It has, like other coronaviruses from genus Betacoronavirus, subgenus Embecovirus, an additional shorter spike protein called hemagglutinin-esterase (HE).

Virology
Four HCoV-OC43 genotypes (A to D) have been identified, with genotype D most likely arising from genetic recombination. The complete genome sequencing of genotypes C and D and bootscan analysis shows recombination events between genotypes B and C in the generation of genotype D. Of 29 viral variants identified, none belong to the more ancient genotype A. Molecular clock analysis using spike and nucleocapsid genes dates the most recent common ancestor of all genotypes to the 1950s. Genotype B and C date to the 1980s. Genotype B to the 1990s, and genotype C to the late 1990s to early 2000s. The recombinant genotype D variants were detected as early as 2004.

Comparison of HCoV-OC43 with the most closely related strain of Betacoronavirus 1 species, bovine coronavirus BCoV, indicated that they had a most recent common ancestor in the late 19th century, with several methods yielding most probable dates around 1890, leading authors to speculate that an introduction of the former strain to the human population might have caused the 1889–1890 pandemic, which at the time was attributed to influenza. The COVID-19 pandemic brought further evidence of a link, as the 1889–1890 pandemic produced symptoms closer to those associated with COVID-19 (the infection caused by the SARS-CoV-2 betacoronavirus) than to influenza. Brüssow,  in August 2021, referred to the evidence that OC43 caused the 1889–1890 outbreak as "indirect, albeit weak" and was "conjectural",  yet the 1889 epidemic was the best historical record to make predictions about the current COVID-19 path due to the similar "clinical and epidemiological characteristics".

The origin of HCoV-OC43 is uncertain, but it is thought that it may have originated in rodents, then passed through cattle as intermediate hosts. A deletion from BCoV to HCoV-OC43 may have taken place for the interspecies transmission event from bovines to humans.

Pathogenesis
Along with HCoV-229E,  a species in the genus Alphacoronavirus, HCoV-OC43 is among the viruses that cause the common cold. Both viruses can cause severe lower respiratory tract infections, including pneumonia in infants, the elderly, and immunocompromised individuals such as those undergoing chemotherapy and those with HIV/AIDS.

If HCoV-OC43 was indeed the pathogen responsible for the 1889–1890 pandemic, which resembled the COVID-19 pandemic, severe disease was much more common and mortality much higher in populations that had not previously been exposed.

Epidemiology
Coronaviruses have a worldwide distribution, causing 10–15% of common cold cases (the virus most commonly implicated in the common cold is a rhinovirus, found in 30–50% of cases). Infections show a seasonal pattern with most cases occurring in the winter months in temperate climates, and summer and spring in warm climates.

See also
Human coronavirus HKU1

References

External links

 Virology online
 Coronaviruses
 Viralzone: Betacoronavirus
 Virus Pathogen Database and Analysis Resource (ViPR): Coronaviridae

Betacoronaviruses
Viral respiratory tract infections
Infraspecific virus taxa